The Taipei Economic and Cultural Office in Canada, also called TECO Canada, is a trade office representing the interests of the Republic of China (Taiwan) in Canada. Located in Ottawa, the office functions as a de facto embassy in the absence of formal diplomatic relations between Canada and Taiwan. 

The office is headed by a representative serving as the de facto ambassador to Canada, currently Winston Chen. Additional branch offices are located in Toronto, Ontario and Vancouver, British Columbia. The Ottawa office handles passport and visa issues for the National Capital Region, Quebec, Newfoundland and Labrador and Saint-Pierre and Miquelon, while offices in Toronto and Vancouver handle needs in the rest of Canada.

The counterpart Canadian office in Taiwan is the Canadian Trade Office in Taipei.

Divisions 
 Public Affairs Division
 Services Division
 Education Division
 Economic Division
 Information Division
 Science and Technology Division

Branches 
 Toronto: Yonge-Richmond Centre Suite 1202, 151 Yonge Street
 Vancouver: The Scotia Tower, 2200 650 West Georgia Street

List of representatives 
 Jason Yuan (1994–1996)
 David Lee (2007–2012)
 Liu Chih-kung (2012–2014)
 Bruce Linghu (2014–2015)
 Wu Rong-chuan (2015–2016)
 Kung Chung-chen (2016–2018)
  (2018-2022)
 Tseng Ho-jen (since 2022)

See also 
 Canada–Taiwan relations
 Taipei Economic and Cultural Representative Office

References

External links 
 

 

Canada
Taiwan
Canada–Taiwan relations